Rosalinda is the second studio album wrote by Italian jazz musician Marco Di Meco, released on June 29, 2015, by Wide Sound Label.

Track listing

Musicians 

Per the liner notes
 Marco Di Meco — flute
 Andrea Conti — electric guitar 
 Fabiano Di Dio — piano, rhodes
 Emanuele Di Teodoro — electric bass 
 Andrea Ciaccio — drums

External links
 http://www.allmusic.com/album/rosalinda-mw0002864556

2015 albums